Missouri Valley may refer to:

 Missouri Valley, Iowa, a small city
 Missouri River Valley
 Missouri Valley Conference, an NCAA Division I non-football college athletic conference
 Missouri Valley Football Conference, an NCAA Division I FCS college athletic conference
 Missouri Valley College in Marshall, Missouri